HD 68988 c is an exoplanet located approximately 192 light-years away in the constellation of Ursa Major, orbiting the star HD 68988. The parameters including period and eccentricity are highly uncertain. The semimajor axis was initially believed to be 5.32 AU with an orbital period of 4100 ± 7300 days (11 years). The planetary orbit was significantly refined in 2021.

See also
 HD 68988 b

References

External links
 
 

Giant planets
Ursa Major (constellation)
Exoplanets discovered in 2006
Exoplanets detected by radial velocity